A threesome is sexual activity involving three people

Threesome may also refer to:
Threesome (1984 film), 1984 TV film starring Stephen Collins and Joel Higgins
Threesome (1994 film), 1994 film by Andrew Fleming
Threesome (2017 film), 2017 film by Nicolas Monette
Threesome (British TV series), a 2011 British television sitcom
Threesome (2021) a Swedish television drama
Threesome (Hong Kong TV series), a 2018 Hong Kong legal comedy drama
"Threesome", song by Fenix TX from Lechuza
"Threesome", an episode on the tenth season of Naked and Afraid

See also
Triad (sociology), a group of three people in sociology
Ménage à trois, any living relationship between three people, at times also involving sex
3SUM, a problem in computational complexity theory
Troika (disambiguation)
Trojak, a Silesian folk dance